Cumulative frequency may refer to:

 Cumulative distribution function
 Cumulative frequency analysis